The 1973 Iowa State Cyclones football team represented Iowa State University in the Big Eight Conference during the 1973 NCAA Division I football season. In their first year under head coach Earle Bruce, the Cyclones compiled a 4–7 record (2–5 against conference opponents), tied for sixth place in the conference, and outscored opponents by a combined total of 245 to 236. They played their home games at Clyde Williams Field in Ames, Iowa.

Larry Hunt and Keith Krepfle were the team captains.

Schedule

Roster

References

Iowa State
Iowa State Cyclones football seasons
Iowa State Cyclones football